Imperial Oil Limited (French: Compagnie Pétrolière Impériale Ltée) is a Canadian petroleum company. It is Canada's second-biggest integrated oil company. It is majority owned by American oil company ExxonMobil with around 69.6 percent ownership stake in the company. It is a significant producer of crude oil, diluted bitumen and natural gas, Canada's major petroleum refiner, a key petrochemical producer and a national marketer with coast-to-coast supply and retail networks.  It supplies Esso-brand service stations.

It is also known for its holdings in the Alberta Oil Sands.  Imperial owns 25 percent of Syncrude, which is one of the world's largest oil sands operations. Imperial is also in a joint venture oil sands mining operation with ExxonMobil, called Kearl Oil Sands.

Imperial Oil is headquartered in Calgary, Alberta. It was based in Toronto, Ontario, until 2005. Most of Imperial's production is from its vast natural resource holdings in the Alberta oil sands and the Norman Wells oil field in the Northwest Territories.

In 2021, Imperial Oil was ranked no. 34 out of 120 oil, gas, and mining companies involved in resource extraction north of the Arctic Circle in the Arctic Environmental Responsibility Index (AERI).

History

Founding and early years 
In April 1880, Jacob Lewis Englehart and sixteen prominent oil refiners in London and Petrolia formed Imperial Oil in response to Standard Oil's growing dominance of the oil market. Englehart was the driving force behind the partnership, hoping to emulate John D. Rockefeller and merge the entire Canadian oil industry into one conglomerate. Although the majority of Ontario's top oil producers agreed to join in the enterprise, notable exceptions were John Henry Fairbank, then Canada's largest oil producer, and James Miller Williams, founder of the Canadian Oil Company. Englehart and the refiners established Imperial Oil as a joint-stock company with a capitalized value of $500,000. In addition to Englehart, the original shareholders included Frederick A. Fitzgerald, Isaac and Herman Waterman, William Spencer and his sons, William and Charles, Thomas and Edward Hodgins, John Geary, Joseph Fallows, John Minhinnick, William English and John Walker. Together, the shareholders possessed twelve oil refineries and controlled eighty-five percent of the refining capacity in Canada. Fitzgerald and Englehart were the two largest stakeholders in the company and were named the president and vice president respectively. Imperial Oil's charter noted that its goal was to "find, produce, refine and distribute petroleum and its products throughout Canada".

Despite a smooth start, Imperial Oil struggled to make a profit and issue dividends in the early 1880s. The discovery of new oil fields in Pennsylvania and New York drove down the price of oil, and the creation of the Standard Oil Trust resulted in an increase of American oil imports into Canada. In a deliberate move to boost kerosene prices, Imperial closed down ten of the twelve refineries it had acquired through the merger, leaving only the Silver Star refinery in Petrolia and the Victor works in London. In 1883, the Victor works was struck by lightning and burned to the ground, and under Englehart's direction, the company concentrated its refining efforts at Petrolia.

Herman Frasch and the Sulphur Dilemma 
In 1884, Imperial Oil purchased the exclusive use of Herman Frasch's fractional distillation patent, which was more efficient at separating crude into usable products. Imperial initially offered Frasch $10,000 and Imperial Oil stock, but he persuaded the company to offer him a salary that matched Fitzgerald's, and a seat on the Board of Directors. Frasch had taken the position primarily to supervise the installation of his refining method at the Silver Star refinery and resigned in February 1885 once the work was complete. Frasch then joined John Minhinnick in forming a separate venture called the Empire Oil Company. The pair purchased an idle refinery in London, and Frasch began experimenting on a way to remove the sulphur content in the oil pumped at Lambton County. The high sulphur content in Canadian oil placed it at a disadvantage compared to the oil mined at Pennsylvania due to its "distinctive odour" when burned. Canadians called the product "skunk oil". Between 1885 and 1887, Frasch discovered that mixing copper oxide with the oil during the distilling process would remove the sulphur content and odour from the refined product.

By this time, Standard Oil had also become interested in the desulphurization process after moving production to oil fields in Ohio that had a similar sulphur content to Lambton County. In 1886, Standard Oil persuaded Frasch to return to the United States and join their company by offering "a salary higher than that of any other scientist in the country", and an exchange of his shares in the Empire Oil Company for an equivalent amount in Standard Oil. After returning to the United States, Frasch perfected his desulphurization strategy, and Standard Oil held a monopoly on the process until 1905. The loss of Frasch and the desulphurization process was a major blow to the long-term future of Imperial Oil.

The 1890s and the Standard Oil buyout 
In spite of rising revenue and growth in the 1890s, Imperial Oil faced continuing challenges in its markets, most notability from Standard Oil, which operated a series of subsidiary companies across Canada. Although Imperial dominated the Western Canadian market, the company could not establish a strong foothold in the Maritimes or Quebec as Standard supplied these regions through long term contracts with local companies. While the Conservative Party's National Policy had stopped Standard Oil from fully entering the Canadian market, the economic policy came under attack by Standard Oil lobbyists and Canadian consumers, who wanted a cheaper and higher quality product. In 1893, Ottawa reduced import duties on refined oil products from 7.2 cents to 6 cents per wine gallon, and in 1896, Wilfrid Laurier's government reduced the tariff again to 5 cents. More importantly, Laurier removed restrictions on tank cars and tank steamers, allowing foreign companies to bulk ship oil into Canada by rail or sea. Before Ottawa lifted the restriction, foreign companies had to repackage their product into oil barrels before entering Canada. This process added roughly five cents in shipping and handling charges to each gallon of imported oil.

In 1895, Imperial Oil's Board of Directors began negotiations to sell the company to the Colonial Development Corporation- a British company. After three years, the deal collapsed, and the Board of Directors instead chose to sell the company to Standard Oil. The agreement specified that Standard Oil would acquire 75 percent of Imperial Oil's shares, Imperial Oil would acquire all of Standard Oil's Canadian subsidiary companies, Imperial's capitalization would be increased to $1 million, and Imperial shareholders would receive a dividend of $93,000. Following the deal, Imperial Oil shut down the Silver Star refinery in Petrolia and moved its refining operations to Sarnia, Ontario.

Later years 
 
In a landmark 1911 anti-trust case, the U.S. Supreme Court ordered Standard Oil to break up into 34 separate companies. Ownership of Imperial Oil, as well Standard Oil's other subsidiaries outside the U.S., were all transferred to only one of those 34 successor firms, Jersey Standard (later renamed Exxon).

Imperial Oil discovered the Leduc Woodbend Devonian oil reef in 1947, marking the beginning of the contemporary period in Canadian oil and gas development.  Drilling began on the landmark discovery well Leduc No. 1 on November 20, 1946.

In 1989, Imperial Oil acquired Texaco's Canadian operations.

When Exxon and Mobil merged in 1999 to form ExxonMobil, the combined company continued to maintain Mobil's Canadian operations as a separate subsidiary, independent of Imperial Oil.

Film and television
From the 1934-35 season through the 1975-76 season, Imperial Oil was a sponsor of the Canadian Broadcasting Corporation program Hockey Night in Canada for both radio and television broadcasts.
Esso had three stars on their signs and leveraged it by sponsoring Hockey Night in Canada's three stars of the game.

In the same era, the company was also involved in film production, frequently providing funding support for the production of independent documentary films. Calgary's Glenbow Museum holds a large collection of Imperial Oil's film inventory.

Corporate governance

Chairman of the Board 
Frederick A. Fitzgerald, 1889–1905
G. Harrison Smith, 1944–1945
Richard V. LeSueur, 1945
Frank W. Pierce, 1945–1947
George L. Stewart, 1947–1949
Henry H. Hewetson, 1949–1950
George L. Stewart, 1953–1955
John R. White, 1960–19??
William O. Twaits, 1970–1974
John A. Armstrong, 1974–1981
Donald K. McIvor, 1981–1985
Arden R. Haynes, 1985–1992
Robert B. Peterson, 1992–2002
Timothy J. Hearn, 2002–2008
Bruce H. March, 2008–2013
Richard M. Kruger, 2013–2019
Bradley W. Corson, 2019–

President 
Frederick A. Fitzgerald, 1880–1889
Frank Q. Barstow, 1889–1908
Horace Chamberlain, 1908–1911
Walter C. Teagle, 1914–1918
William J. Hanna, 1918–1919
Charles O. Stillman, 1919–1933
G. Harrison Smith, 1933–1944
Richard V. LeSueur, 1944–1945
Henry H. Hewetson, 1945–1949
George L. Stewart, 1949–1953
John R. White, 1953–1960
William O. Twaits, 1960–1970
John A. Armstrong, 1970–1979
James R. Livingstone, 1979–1982
Arden R. Haynes, 1982–1988
Robert B. Peterson, 1988–1992
Ronald A. Brenneman, 1992–1994
Robert B. Peterson, 1994–2001
Timothy J. Hearn, 2001–2007
Bruce H. March, 2007–2013
Richard M. Kruger, 2013–2019
Bradley W. Corson, 2019–

Retail 

Imperial Oil supplies more than 2,000 service stations as of October  2020, all of which are owned by third parties. It sold its remaining 497 stations in 2016 to retailers such as Alimentation Couche-Tard (mostly Ontario and Quebec), 7-Eleven (mostly Alberta and British Columbia), Parkland, Harnois (Quebec) and Wilson Fuel (Atlantic Canada). In the late early 1990s Imperial Oil had acquired retail operations from Texaco's Canadian unit Texaco Canada Incorporated.

With ExxonMobil having majority ownership, Imperial Oil licenses its parent company's brands, including the Esso and Mobil names for service stations, and the Speedpass electronic payment system.

Until 2018, Imperial Oil was a member of the rewards program Aeroplan. On March 13, 2018, Loblaw Companies announced that it had reached a deal for the Esso-branded stations to join the PC Optimum rewards program, beginning on June 1, 2018. Loblaw Companies had sold its network of 213 gas stations (all of which are attached to its various grocery store locations) to Brookfield Business Partners in 2017; Brookfield entered into an agreement with Imperial Oil to use the Mobil brand for these stations. As part of the sale agreement, these stations also continue to participate in PC Optimum.

See also

 Dartmouth Refinery
 Nanticoke Refinery
 Strathcona Refinery
 Imperial Oil Building (former Toronto headquarters building)
 Nuns' Island gas station, an Esso station designed by Ludwig Mies van der Rohe in 1969
 Ioco, Port Moody

References

External links

Companies listed on NYSE American
Companies listed on the Toronto Stock Exchange
Companies based in Calgary
S&P/TSX 60
ExxonMobil subsidiaries
Oil companies of Canada
Chemical companies of Canada
Natural gas companies of Canada
Automotive fuel retailers
Energy companies established in 1880
Canadian subsidiaries of foreign companies
Gas stations in Canada
1880 establishments in Ontario
Canadian companies established in 1880